Scinax cuspidatus is a species of frog in the family Hylidae.
It is endemic to Brazil.
Its natural habitats are subtropical or tropical moist lowland forests, subtropical or tropical moist shrubland, subtropical or tropical dry lowland grassland, freshwater marshes, intermittent freshwater marshes, rocky areas, heavily degraded former forest, and ponds.
It is threatened by habitat loss.

References

cuspidatus
Endemic fauna of Brazil
Amphibians of Brazil
Amphibians described in 1925
Taxa named by Adolfo Lutz
Taxonomy articles created by Polbot